Claudius Postumus Dardanus was a praetorian prefect of Gaul from the early fifth century AD, who was against Jovinus, considered as a usurper of imperial authority. Dardanus made him suffer the last penalty after he had been defeated in Valencia by King of the Goths Ataulf.

In all likelihood, Dardanus came from a modest background and due to his studies and abilities reached the status of a patrician (an honorary position in the Lower Empire related to the acquisition of effective status as a senator), and access to the post of prefect of the Gauls twice, probably the first time in 401-404 or 406-407 and 412–413 in a second time after the transfer in 407 of the seat of praetorian prefecture of Gaul from Augusta Treverorum (Trier) to Arelate (Arles).

Dardanus was converted to Christianity and then retired to the Alps, where he began a correspondence with Jerome and Augustine of Hippo. An admirer of St. Augustine, with whom he had established a correspondence, he founded an institution called Theopolis (Greek: "City of God").  This institution was established in his domain, for which he expanded on both sides of the road leading from Sisteron to the present village of Saint-Geniez to which it gives the walls and doors. No archaeological remains of this city exist, only a Latin inscription carved in the rock face along the road.

References 
 Andreas Agnellus, Liber pontificalis ecclesiae Ravennatis (« Annales de Ravenne »). Translated in English in Deborah Mauskopf Deliyannis, The Book of Pontiffs of the Church of Ravenna. Washington: Catholic University of America Press, 2004.
 Sidonius Apollinaris, Lettres, V, 9.1. Lettre à Aquilinus. Édition des Belles-Lettres (Collection des Universités de France), Tome II, vol. 199. 
 The Prosopography of the Later Roman Empire by John Robert Martindale, through Google Books

Praetorian prefects of Gaul
Converts to Christianity from pagan religions
5th-century Christians
5th-century Gallo-Roman people